In sociology, will is a concept introduced by Ferdinand Tönnies in "Gemeinschaft und Gesellschaft", 1887. Tönnies' approach was very much indebted to Spinoza's dictum voluntas atque intellectus unum et idem sunt ("will as well as ratio are one and the same"), and to Arthur Schopenhauer.

Tönnies saw a fundamental cleavage between "essential will" (Wesenwille) creating community (Gemeinschaft), and "arbitrary will" (Kürwille), creating society (Gesellschaft) - see Ferdinand Tönnies.

See also
Neuroscience of free will
Voluntarism (action)

Sociological terminology